Masao (written: 正雄, 正夫, 正生, 正男, 正郎, 雅雄, 雅央, 雅夫, 雅勇, 雅男, 昌雄, 昌夫, 昌男, 昌朗, 昌郎, 昌大, 政雄, 政夫, 政男, 政於, 征夫, 優夫, 聖雄, 利生, 将雄, 将夫 or 眞男) is a masculine Japanese given name. Notable people with the name include:

, Japanese philosopher and writer
, Japanese screenwriter and film director
, Japanese politician
, Japanese sumo wrestler
, Japanese sport wrestler
, Japanese motorcycle racer
, Japanese general
Masao Doi, Japanese academic
, Japanese baseball player
, Japanese photographer and sculptor
Inaba Masao, Japanese military officer and rebel
, Japanese activist and academic
, Japanese triple jumper
, Japanese photographer
, Japanese sprinter
, Japanese actor and film director
, Japanese professional wrestler
, Japanese neuroscientist
, former President of the Republic of China (Taiwan)
Masao Kanamitsu (1943–2011), Japanese American meteorologist
, Japanese Go player
, Japanese primatologist
, Japanese footballer
, Japanese baseball player
, Japanese businessman
, Japanese botanist
, Japanese sumo wrestler
, Japanese politician
, Japanese composer and guitarist
, Japanese actor
, Japanese theoretical physicist
, Japanese playwright, writer and poet
, Japanese printmaker
, Japanese animator and film producer
, Japanese general
, Japanese political scientist and historian
, Japanese volcanologist
, Japanese psychiatrist
, Japanese sociologist
, Japanese baseball player
, Japanese conductor
, Japanese ice hockey player
, Japanese judoka
, Japanese cinematographer
, Japanese general
, Japanese politician and diplomat
, Japanese footballer
, Japanese boxer
, Japanese footballer
, Japanese professional wrestler
, Japanese World War II flying ace
, Japanese singer
, Japanese actor
, Japanese drifting driver
Masao Sugimoto (born 1967), Japanese footballer
, Japanese Go player
Masao Takada, Japanese footballer
, former President of South Korea
Masao Takahashi (born 1929), Canadian judoka
, Japanese artistic gymnast
Masao Takenaka (1925–2006), Japanese theologian
, Japanese television producer
Masao Tsuchida, Japanese baseball player
, Japanese shogi player
, Japanese footballer and manager
, Japanese lyricist, screenwriter and film director
, Japanese general
, Japanese jazz musician 
, Japanese anthropologist
, Japanese photographer
Masao Yoshida (disambiguation), multiple people

Japanese masculine given names